Skylab III is the third studio album by the Brazilian musician Rogério Skylab, the third in his series of ten eponymous, numbered albums. It was self-released in 2002.

Skylab acknowledges that Skylab III was heavily influenced, both lyrically and musically, by one of his greatest idols, outsider musician Damião Experiença; the album was dedicated to him, and the track "Esqueletos" opens up with a lengthy sample of one of Damião's songs.

"Blues do Para-Choque", originally featured on Skylab's debut Fora da Grei, was re-recorded for this release. "Cântico dos Cânticos" contains numerous samples from Rogério Sganzerla's 1968 film The Red Light Bandit and Arrigo Barnabé's song "Clara Crocodilo". "É Tudo Falso" uses samples from the songs "Willie the Pimp" by Frank Zappa and "Mongo" by Zumbi do Mato.

The album can be downloaded for free on Skylab's official website.

Track listing

Personnel
 Rogério Skylab – vocals, production
 Toni Boca – electric guitar (tracks 1 to 9)
 Wlad – bass guitar (tracks 1 to 9)
 Sérgio Naciffe – drums (tracks 1 to 9)
 Alexandre Guichard – classical guitar (tracks 1 to 9)
 Alexandre BG – electric guitar (track 11)
 Leonel Vilar – bass guitar (track 11)
 Marcelo Paz – drums (track 11)
 Duda Suliano – mixing
 Luiz Tornaghi – mastering
 Solange Venturi – photography
 Luísa Bousada – cover art

References

2002 albums
Rogério Skylab albums
Self-released albums
Sequel albums
Obscenity controversies in music
Albums free for download by copyright owner